The 2018–19 Bobsleigh World Cup was a multi-race series over a season for bobsleigh. The season started on 8 December 2018 in Sigulda, Latvia and finished on 24 February 2019 in Calgary, Canada. The World Cup was organised by the IBSF (formerly the FIBT) who also run World Cups and Championships in skeleton. The season was sponsored by BMW.

Calendar
Below is the schedule of the 2018–19 season.

Results

Two-man

Four-man

Two-woman

Standings

Two-man

Four-man

Two-woman

Medal table

References

Bobsleigh World Cup
2018 in bobsleigh
2019 in bobsleigh